Shicheng may refer to:

 Shicheng, Beijing, in Miyun District, Beijing, China
 Shicheng County, in Ganzhou, Jiangxi Province, China
 Shicheng (Zhejiang), in Chun'an County, Hangzhou, Zhejiang Province, China

See also
 Shicheng station (disambiguation)